Chuangjing Road is a metro station on Line 5 and Line 19 of Hangzhou Metro in China. It is located in Yuhang District of Hangzhou.

Gallery

References

Railway stations in Zhejiang
Railway stations in China opened in 2020
Hangzhou Metro stations